The Eerste Klasse is an association football league for women in the Netherlands. Clubs relegate to this league from the Hoofdklasse and promote to the Eerste Klasse from the Tweede Klasse.

The Eerste Klasse is divided into a Saturday and a Sunday competition:
Eerste Klasse Saturday
 Group A: 12 clubs
 Group B: 12 clubs

Eerste Klasse Sunday
 Group C: 12 clubs
 Group D: 12 clubs

Women's football leagues in the Netherlands